Uddhaar is 1949 Bollywood film directed by S.S. Kulkarni and starring Dev Anand, Bharat Bhushan and Nirupa Roy.

References

External links 
 

1949 films
1940s Hindi-language films
Indian drama films
1949 drama films
Indian black-and-white films
Hindi-language drama films